Max Silvestri (born 1983) is an American stand-up comedian.

Early life, family and education

Silvestri graduated from Brown University in 2005, concentrating on art and semiotics. While at Brown, he performed in an improv comedy troupe and wrote for The Brown Jug.

Career
Silvestri began working as a stand-up comedian whilst writing for GQ, Food & Wine and Grantland. He hosted the Brooklyn comedian show "Big Terrific" with Jenny Slate and Gabe Liedman, which Time Out New York named the best new stand up act.

In 2016, he hosted a cooking competition show on Bravo, Recipe for Deception.

Silvestri  appeared on Ken Reid's TV Guidance Counselor Podcast on April 1, 2015, and on Jessica Williams and Phoebe Robinson's 2 Dope Queens podcast on November 29, 2016.

References

Living people
1983 births
Brown University alumni
American stand-up comedians
21st-century American comedians